High-speed rail in Italy consists of two lines connecting most of the country's major cities. The first line connects Turin to Salerno via Milan, Bologna, Florence, Rome and Naples, the second runs from Turin to Venice via Milan and Verona, and is under construction in parts.

Passenger service is provided by Trenitalia and, since April 2012, by NTV, the world's first private open-access operator of high-speed rail to compete with a state-owned monopoly.
25 million passengers traveled on the network in 2011.
In 2015, ridership increased to 55 million for Trenitalia and 9.1 million for NTV, for a combined 64 million passengers.

History

The first high-speed rail route in Italy, the Direttissima, opened in 1977, connecting Rome with Florence. This line used a 3 kV DC supply.

The prototype train ETR X 500 was the first Italian train to reach  on the Direttissima on 25 May 1989.

The Italian high-speed rail projects suffered from a number of cost overruns and delays. Corruption and unethical behaviour played a key role.

In November 2018, the first high-speed freight rail in the world commenced service in Italy.

Rolling stock

Service on the high speed lines is provided by Trenitalia and the privately owned NTV. Several types of high-speed trains carry out the service:

It operates mainly on traditional lines;
It operates mainly on traditional lines;
 ETR 675: non-tilting, operated by NTV as Italo;

Current limitations on the tracks set the maximum operating speed of the trains at  after plans for  operations were cancelled. 

TGV trains also run on the Paris-Turin-Milan service, but do not use any high-speed line in Italy.

Network

The following high-speed rail lines are in use.

The table shows minimum and maximum (depending on stops) travel times.

Milan to Salerno Corridor 
The Milan to Salerno is the major north–south corridor of the high-speed network.

The Milan–Bologna segment opened on 13 December 2008. Its construction cost was about 6.9 billion euro. The  line runs parallel to the Autostrada del Sole, crossing seven provinces and 32 municipalities. There are eight connections with historic lines. At the Reggio Emilia interconnection a new station designed by the Valencian architect Santiago Calatrava was opened in June 2013. Calatrava has also designed a signature bridge where the line crosses the A1 motorway. The line travels through a new multi-level station at Bologna (Italy's principal railway junction) designed by Japanese architect Arata Isozaki.

The Bologna–Florence segment opened on 12 December 2009, allowing a 37-minute journey between the two cities. The Bologna-Florence high-speed section was particularly complex to build mainly because about 93% of its  runs through tunnels under the Apennines mountain range. Florence will have a major new multi-level high speed station at Belfiore designed by British architect Norman Foster.

The first high-speed line in Europe, the "Direttissima" was completed in between 1977 and 1992. This segment is being upgraded by Rete Ferroviaria Italiana. Entering Rome, high-speed trains have the option of stopping at either the new intermodal station at Tiburtina, developed by architects ABD Associate led by Paolo Desideri, or Termini station.

The Rome-Naples segment heads south from the Italian capital. Service on the first new high speed segment of the project started in December 2005. This line runs through 61 municipalities in two regions (Lazio and Campania) and connects with the existing national rail network at Frosinone Nord, Cassino Sud and Caserta Nord. On 13 December 2009, work was completed on the last  of the line between Gricignano and Napoli Centrale. In the Campania region, the line passes through Afragola where a major new transfer station has been built, designed by Iraqi-born architect Zaha Hadid.

Turin to Trieste Corridor 
The Novara to Milan segment opened on 12 December 2009, allowing a 59-minute journey between Milan Centrale and Turin Porta Nuova (45 minutes from Milan Porta Garibaldi to Turin Porta Susa). To minimize its environmental impact on the area, almost the entire length of the Turin to Milan high-speed line was constructed parallel to the A4 Turin-Milan motorway.

The Milan to Venice segment includes stretches from Padova to Mestre (for Venice), in service since March 2007, and Milan to Brescia, which runs alongside the A35 motorway and opened for service on 11 December 2016. Between Brescia and Verona the new high-speed line will parallel the A4 motorway for 30 of its , and a 7.4-km tunnel will be constructed at Lonato del Garda. This section is due for completion in 2023. The final  stretch between Verona and Padua will be constructed by quadrupling the existing railway. The contract for this was let in August 2020 with completion scheduled for 2027. The section between Verona and Vicenza is to be constructed first.

Ports and Trans-European Connections 

A new line connecting Milan to the port of Genoa is now in development and further expansion of the trans-Alpine lines will integrate the Italian network with the European networks planned by the EU and the large intermodal pan-European transport corridors.

The objective of the new Alpine rail links is to increase rail transport, aimed mainly at supporting the forecast development of freight transport on international lines, complete interoperability between European High Speed networks, the shift from road to rail of a large percentage of freight for modal rebalancing, higher safety levels in tunnels as specified in the new European technology and construction standards.

Planned engineering works include the construction of new international lines and the upgrading of existing Italian track on the following lines:
 Frejus (see Turin-Lyon high-speed railway)
 Gotthard (Chiasso-Monza and Gallarate-Bellinzona)
 Simplon (Domodossola-Novara railway)
 Brenner (Fortezza-Innsbruck)
 Tarvisio - Semmering (Udine-Tarvisio)
 Eastern Pass Valico Orientale (Venice-Trieste-Ronchi dei Legionari)

Lines under construction

Milan–Genoa 

A line from Milan to Genoa was approved in 2006 at €6.2 billion; construction work started in 2011. Work between Genoa and Tortona was temporarily halted due to funding problems, but restarted in 2019 and now is expected to be completed by 2026.

Milan–Venice 

On the line from Milan to Venice high speed trains still have to use the conventional line between Brescia and Padua. The remaining portion from Brescia to Padua is under construction at a cost of €2.5 billion, while the rest of the line is already in operation. The section between Brescia and Verona will be completed in 2023 while construction should finish on the section between Verona and Padua in 2027, including a 7.7 kilometer tunnel between Lonato del Garda and Desenzano del Garda.

Naples–Bari 
The construction of the line from Naples to Bari began in 2015 and will cut Naples–Bari journeys from four to two hours. Totaling €6.2 billion for the whole project, the final €2.1 billion needed to complete the project was approved in 2019. The completion of the line is projected for 2027.

Palermo–Catania 
Palermo and Catania, Sicily's largest cities, are currently connected by a double-track railway which is limited to a single-track section between Catenanuova and Bicocca (near Catania). This requires trains to stop and wait for the train from the opposite direction to pass. The first step to improving this line is doubling this single-track section of 38 kilometers. This will enable a higher maximum speed of  compared to the current . Construction started in 2019 at a cost of €415 million. The work on both tracks is expected to finish in 2023. The upgrade of the line will reduce the journey time between Palermo and Catania to one hour and 45 minutes in 2025, saving one hour.

Turin–Lyon 

The Turin–Lyon line should connect Turin, Lyon and Chambéry, and join the Italian and the French high speed rail networks. It would take over the role of the current Fréjus railway. The project costs €26 billion, with the Mont d'Ambin Base Tunnel, a 57.5 kilometer trans-alpine tunnel between Italy and France, costing €18.3 billion. Although the plan was highly controversial, the Italian senate approved funding in mid-2019, with the project tentatively due to be completed in 2032.

Verona–Innsbruck 
The Brenner Base Tunnel will link Verona, Innsbruck, and Munich, and thus connect the Italian, Austrian and German railways. The tunnel is the most important link in a series of projects that will create a single connection from Berlin in Germany to Palermo in Sicily as part of the Trans-European Transport Networks. The tunnel crosses the border between Innsbruck in Austria and Franzensfeste in Italy. The total costs of the tunnel are estimated at around €8.4 billion, of which 40% is co-financed in equal measure by Italy and Austria and 50% by the European Union. As of 2020, half of the tunnel's length has been excavated and it is due to be opened in 2032.

A new high speed line between Verona and Fortezza is constructed on the Italian side and is about 180 kilometers long. The line will have a design speed of 200–250 kilometers and will quadruple the current two tracks of the existing low speed line. It has been budgeted at approximately €5 billion and is expected to be completed by the end of the works on the Brenner Base Tunnel.

Lines planned

Salerno–Reggio Calabria 
A line from Salerno to Reggio Calabria is currently in the planning stage. It is expected to be operational by 2030. The new line will be 445 kilometers long and cost €22.8 billion. It will reduce the travel time from Rome to Reggio Calabria to three hours and forty minutes. This compares to five hours of current travel time for the existing railway between Salerno and Reggio Calabria, excluding the section between Rome and Salerno.

The project is divided into seven functional lots:
 Salerno-Battipaglia
 Battipaglia-Praia a Mare
 Praja a Mare-Tarsia
 Tarsia-Montalto Uffugo
 Montalto Uffugo-Lamezia Terme
 Lamezia Terme-Gioia Tauro
 Gioia Tauro-Reggio Calabria

See also
 
 Ferrovie dello Stato Italiane
 Nuovo Trasporto Viaggiatori
 Railway stations in Italy
 Rete Ferroviaria Italiana
 Trenitalia
 Treno Alta Velocità
 Eurostar Italia

Further reading
 Binari dal Tevere all'Arno. La nuova linea direttissima Roma-Firenze, Roma, Ufficio relazioni aziendali delle Ferrovie dello Stato, 1974
 La Direttissima Roma-Firenze, in Ingegneria ferroviaria, gennaio 1978
 Azienda autonoma Ferrovie dello Stato, Direttissima Roma-Firenze, Roma, Ufficio relazioni aziendali delle Ferrovie dello Stato, 1978
 La Direttissima Roma-Firenze, in Ingegneria ferroviaria, marzo 1991
 Giampaolo Mancini, Donato Carillo, Mauro Papi, Prove a 320 km/h dell'ETR 500 Politensione, in Ingegneria ferroviaria, 56 (2001), n. 8, pp. 513–519
 Bruno Cirillo, Paolo Comastri, Pier Luigi Guida, Antonio Ventimiglia, L'Alta Velocità ferroviaria, Roma, Collegio Ingegneri Ferroviari Italiani, 2009,

External links
 rfi.it - Rete Ferroviaria Italiana (RFI), infrastructure manager
 Railway Technology.com article on Italian High Speed Rail, including NTV
 trenitalia.com - Trenitalia official website and online booking
 italotreno.it - Nuovo Trasporto Viaggiatori (NTV) Italo online booking

References